The good regulator is a theorem conceived by Roger C. Conant and W. Ross Ashby that is central to cybernetics. Originally stated that "every good regulator of a system must be a model of that system", but more accurately, every good regulator must contain a model of the system. That is, any regulator that is maximally simple among optimal regulators must behave as an image of that system under a homomorphism; while the authors sometimes say 'isomorphism', the mapping they construct is only a homomorphism.

Theorem
This theorem is obtained by considering the entropy of the variation of the output of the controlled system, and shows that, under very general conditions, that the entropy is minimized when there is a (deterministic) mapping   from the states of the system to the states of the regulator.  The authors view this map  as making the regulator a 'model' of the system. 

With regard to the brain, insofar as it is successful and efficient as a regulator for survival, it must proceed, in learning, by the formation of a model (or models) of its environment.

The theorem is general enough to apply to all regulating and self-regulating or homeostatic systems. 

The theorem does not explain what it takes for the system to become a good regulator. In cybernetics, the problem of creating good regulators is addressed by the ethical regulator theorem, and by the theory of practopoiesis.  The construction of good regulators is a general problem for any system (e.g., an automated information system) that regulates some domain of application.

When restricted to the ordinary differential equation (ODE) subset of control theory, it is referred to as the internal model principle, which was first articulated in 1976 by B. A. Francis and W. M. Wonham.  In this form, it stands in contrast to classical control, in that the classical feedback loop fails to explicitly model the controlled system (although the classical controller may contain an implicit model).

See also 
 Analogy#Mathematics
 Map–territory relation
 Variety (cybernetics)
 Internal model (motor control)
 Ethical regulator
 W. Ross Ashby

References 

Cybernetics
Management cybernetics